Amaré Barno (born April 26, 1999) is an American football defensive end for the Carolina Panthers of the National Football League (NFL). He played college football at Butler Community College before transferring to Virginia Tech. Barno was drafted by the Panthers in the sixth round of the 2022 NFL Draft.

Early life and high school
Barno grew up in Blythewood, South Carolina and attended Westwood High School. He played the safety position in high school. Barno failed to qualify academically to play Division I football and enrolled at Butler Community College.

College career
Barno began his college career at Butler Community College, where coaches moved him from safety to linebacker. As a sophomore, he recorded 66 tackles, 14 tackles for loss and 4.5 sacks. In 2018, Barno committed to transfer to Virginia Tech for his remaining eligibility.

Barno played in three games in his first season at Virginia Tech in 2019 as an outside linebacker before redshirting the rest of the season. Going into his redshirt junior season, he was again moved to a different position and played defensive end. Barno finished the season a team-high 6.5 sacks and led the Atlantic Coast Conference with 16 tackles for loss. Barno recorded 5.5 tackles for loss with 3.5 sacks in 2021. Following the end of the season, Barno declared that he would be entering the 2022 NFL Draft, and ran a 4.37 40-yard dash at the NFL combine, faster than any linebacker or defensive lineman that year.

Professional career

Barno was drafted by the Carolina Panthers in the sixth round (189th overall) in the 2022 NFL Draft. He finished his rookie season with 9 tackles and 2.0 sacks in 9 games played.

References

External links
 Carolina Panthers bio
 Virginia Tech Hokies bio
 Butler Grizzlies bio

1999 births
Living people
People from Blythewood, South Carolina
Players of American football from South Carolina
American football defensive ends
Butler Grizzlies football players
Virginia Tech Hokies football players
Carolina Panthers players
American football linebackers